is a Japanese multimedia franchise by Satoshi Mizukami. Mizukami launched a manga series published in Shōnen Gahōsha's Young King OURs from April 2018 to July 2022. An anime television series by J.C.Staff aired from July to September 2018.

Plot
Sōya Kuroi lives with a large cat-like creature called Sensei and a happy maid named Ginko. One day, strange floating beasts appear in the sky above Japan, and conventional weapons are useless against them, until seven men and women transform into powerful weapons and destroy them. Sōya finds himself pressed into battle, fighting not against the beasts, but against the seven heroes instead, as he becomes an unwitting pawn in an interstellar war that has come to Earth.

Characters

A high school-aged boy with amnesia who can barely remember what happened further than one year ago. He eventually regains some of his memories and realizes the members of Grand Paladin are using similar powers to the ones that led to the destruction of his home planet, Sirius, from which he is the only survivor. A running gag is that he is kept from eating meat, either intentionally by Ginko or accidentally by others.

A maid living with Soya who assists their Sensei. She is later revealed to be the Princess of the planet Riel who was saved by Sensei after being attacked by Sirius soldiers. Despite this, she came to Sirius with Sensei and rescued Sōya, adopting him. Ginko has various psychic powers.
 / 

A large purple cat who usually speaks in meows that Ginko translates. Revealed to be a leader of the Pacifist Faction of the Nebulans who tried to save the planet Sirius before it was destroyed. Capable of transforming into a small mech that Soya pilots after being swallowed by him. Sensei also has a spaceship that looks like his normal form, but at a massive scale. His other name, Rashaverak, appears to be a reference to one of the overlords from the novel Childhood's End.

The representative of Soya's class and member of the school's Occult Research Club. Constantly referred to as "Glasses" (Megane-san) because Soya can't remember her real name.

Hideo is former firefighter who quit to join Grand Paladin. He lost his mother in a fire in middle school and joined the fire department after high school.

Miu is a young Judoka who is best friends with Harumi, hoping to one day be as strong as her. Member of Grand Paladin.

Young Judoka and Miu's classmate who wants to be pampered by Miu. Member of Grand Paladin.

Graduate of Soya's highschool who occasionally visits the Occult Research Club. Adds dramatic flair to most of his actions and claims his name (Seigi) is because his father wanted him to be a lawyer, though in truth his family is a long line of sake brewers. Member of Grand Paladin.

A redheaded woman and former junior police detective. Member of Grand Paladin who later joins the Sealing Faction.

Member of Grand Paladin who later joins the Sealing Faction with Benika. The younger brother of the late police detective who was Benika's partner.

The leader of Grand Paladin and arguably their strongest member. Suspected of being the reincarnation of the dragon that destroyed Sirius by the Generalissimo.

Takeshi's secretary within Grand Paladin who seems to know more about the Nebula Weapons than she lets on. Later revealed to be a Rielian like Ginko and a member of the Sealing Faction who translates the Generalissimo's barks into speech and pilots his mech form.

Takashi's father and another Member of Grand Paladin. Has a love of meat and is infamous for visiting steakhouses and spending lavishly on meat there. Claimed to have found Takashi when he landed on Earth from space and raised him as his own son, but played it off as a joke to Yosuke.
 / 

A big white dog-like creature who leads the Sealing Faction of the Nebulans. Similar to Sensei, he can turn into a larger, armored version of himself after swallowing Kogane. He also rides a gigantic spaceship that looks like himself. Like Sensei, his other name appears to be a reference to one of the overlords from Childhood's End.

Production
Shōnen Gahōsha first hinted at the project on November 30, 2017, when they announced that Satoshi Mizukami would be writing a new "large-scale" science fiction series in April after his current manga finished serialization. The series was officially announced on March 23, 2018. Mizukami had begun work on the series four years prior, and has drawn 1,074 pages of storyboards for the project, in addition to writing both the manga and the anime.

Media

Manga
Satoshi Mizukami launched a manga version of the story in Shōnen Gahōsha's seinen manga magazine Young King OURs on April 28, 2018. The manga entered its final arc on July 30, 2021. The manga is published in English by Crunchyroll Manga. The seventh volume was published on January 31, 2022.

Anime
The anime television series was written and storyboarded by Mizukami and directed by Youhei Suzuki, with animation by J.C.Staff. Kazunori Iwakura adapted Mizukami's character designs for animation. Yoshitsune Izuna and Yasuyoshi Uetsu were the series' mechanical designers, and Tsuyoshi Isomoto was the prop designer. Yoshikazu Iwanami was the sound director. Kōhei Tanaka composed the series' music. Minami performed th opening theme song "One Unit", while Mai Fuchigami performed the ending theme.

The series aired from July 8 to September 23, 2018, and was broadcast on Tokyo MX, MBS, and BS11. The series was simulcasted by Crunchyroll.

Notes

References

External links
  
 

Crunchyroll anime
Crunchyroll manga
J.C.Staff
Mecha anime and manga
Seinen manga
Shōnen Gahōsha manga
Tokyo MX original programming